Abi-ye Sofla (also Romanized as Ābī-ye Soflá; also known as Ābī, Avi, and Awi) is a village in Khararud Rural District, in the Central District of Khodabandeh County, Zanjan Province, Iran. At the 2006 census, its population was 1,768, in 400 families.

References 

Populated places in Khodabandeh County